Three vessels of the Royal Navy have been named HMS Salmon after the fish:

 , launched in 1895, was a  that was sold in 1911.
 , launched 30 April 1934, was an S-class submarine which fought in World War II and was lost, probably sunk by a mine, on 9 July 1940.

References

Royal Navy ship names